Yusuf Husain Khan (1902–1979), born in Hyderabad, Hyderabad State, British India, was a historian, scholar, educationist, critic and author. He mastered the languages of Arabic, English, French, Urdu, Hindi and Persian.

Early life and education
Born in Hyderabad, India to a cultured and educated family, he was a younger brother of Zakir Husain, the third president of India (1967–1969). He went to school in Etawah. In 1926, he gained his BA from Jamia Millia Islamia, Delhi and in 1930 he gained his D Litt from the University of Paris, France.

Career
After returning from Paris in 1930, he assisted Abdul Haq to compile an English-Urdu dictionary and translate scientific terminology into Urdu.

He joined Osmania University in 1930 as a lecturer and worked there until 1957, when he retired as a professor. He joined Aligarh Muslim University as a Pro-Vice Chancellor and worked there until 1965.

Books
 Tarikh-e-Hind (Ahd e halia). History of India and East India Company until 1939.
 Tarikh–e–Deccan (Ahd e halia). History of Deccan.
 Mudabadi e umraniat (translation from French)
 Rooh e Iqbal
 Urdu Gazal
 Hasrat ki shairi
 Fransisi adab (an analysis of French literature and language )

 Ghalib aur ahang e Ghalib (1971)
 Urdu gazals of Ghalib (1975)
 Persian ghazals of Ghalib (1976)
 Hafiz aur Iqbal (1976),

English books
 The first Nizām; the life and times of Nizāmu'l-Mulk Āsaf Jāh I (1963)

Awards
The Government of India awarded Khan the Padma Bhushan, the third highest civilian award, in 1977. He received the Sahitya Academy Award in 1978 for his book, Hafiz aur Iqbal, which was published in 1976.

References

1902 births
1976 deaths
Writers from Hyderabad, India
Aligarh Muslim University alumni
Jamia Millia Islamia
People from Etawah
People from Farrukhabad
Historians of India
Urdu-language writers
Urdu-language poets from India
20th-century Indian poets
20th-century Indian historians
Recipients of the Padma Bhushan in literature & education
Recipients of the Sahitya Akademi Award in Urdu